In computing, a bucky bit is a bit in a binary representation of a character that is set by pressing on a keyboard modifier key other than the shift key.

Overview
Setting a bucky bit changes the output character. A bucky bit allows the user to type a wider variety of characters and commands while maintaining a reasonable number of keys on a keyboard.

Some of the keys corresponding to bucky bits on modern keyboards are the alt key, control key, meta key, command key (⌘), super key, and option key.

In ASCII, the bucky bit is usually the 8th bit (also known as meta bit). However, in older character representations wider than 8 bits, more high bits could be used as bucky bits. In the modern X Window System, bucky bits are bits 18–23 of an event code.

History
The term was invented at Stanford and is based on Niklaus Wirth's nickname "Bucky". Niklaus Wirth was first to suggest an EDIT key to set the eighth bit of a 7-bit ASCII character sometime in 1964 or 1965.

Bucky bits were used heavily on keyboards designed by Tom Knight at MIT, including space-cadet keyboards used on LISP machines. These could contain as many as seven modifier keys: SHIFT, CTRL, META, HYPER, SUPER, TOP, and GREEK (also referred to as FRONT).

See also
 Knight keyboard

References

External links
 MIT Scheme reference

Character encoding
Computer keys